Sarcodon quietus is a species of tooth fungus in the family Bankeraceae. Found in the Congo, it was described as new to science in 1967 by Dutch mycologist Rudolph Arnold Maas Geesteranus.

References

External links

Fungi described in 1967
Fungi of Africa
quietus